is a Japanese manga series written and illustrated by Ayaka Katayama. It began serialization in Bessatsu Shōnen Magazine in March 2021. As of November 2022, the series' individual chapters have been collected into three volumes.

Publication
Written and illustrated by Ayaka Katayama, the series began serialization in Kodansha's Bessatsu Shōnen Magazine on March 9, 2021. In August 2021, the series went on hiatus due to Katayama going on maternity leave; the series resumed serialization in March 2022. As of November 2022, the individual chapters have been collected into three tankōbon volume.

In January 2022, Kodansha USA announced that they licensed the series for English publication.

Volume list

Reception
Christopher Farris from Anime News Network offered praise for the setting-up of the story in the first volume, though felt the artwork was a bit amateurish in places. Kazuhiko Otoguro, an editor at Bessatsu Shōnen Magazine, picked the series as his favorite manga from 2021.

References

External links
  
 

Adventure anime and manga
Dark fantasy anime and manga
Kodansha manga
Science fiction anime and manga
Shōnen manga